The Bioko leaf-toed gecko (Hemidactylus biokoensis) is a species of forest geckos from Bioko Island (Equatorial Guinea). It occurs in the coastal areas of the island and it has also been found in a forest immediately adjacent to the beach.

References

Further reading
Martín Sanz, Ignacio. "Lepidópteros ropalóceros de la Caldera de Lubá. Isla de Bioko (Guinea Ecuatorial)." (2015).

Hemidactylus
Geckos of Africa
Endemic fauna of Equatorial Guinea
Reptiles of Equatorial Guinea
Reptiles described in 2014
Taxa named by Philipp Wagner